A Minor Forest was a San Francisco-based math rock band active from 1992 to 1998.

History 
The band formed after Andee Connors left his home in San Diego to start a career in music in the San Francisco Bay Area. After a brief stint in Cradlestone RIP and the Sutter Valley Claimjumpers (as Sandee Shotgun), In 1992, he met bassist John Trevor Benson and guitarist Erik Hoversten, forming the band. They were musically related to the Louisville scene of post-rock groups like Slint and had personal connections to Three Mile Pilot. 

Their songs incorporated elements of pop, progressive rock, and punk rock. The group released three albums: Flemish Altruism (1996) and Inindependence (1998) on Chicago label Thrill Jockey, and So, Were They in Some Sort of Fight? (1999), a career-spanning compilation on My Pal God records. On November 9, 2013, they played for the first time in 15 years at Bottom of the Hill in San Francisco. Until that show, their most recent performance was held on November 1, 1998, at the Great American Music Hall in San Francisco.

Personnel 
Erik Hoversten
Andee Connors 
John Trevor Benson
Dominique Davison

Discography 

 Flemish Altruism (Constituent Parts 1993-1996) CD (Thrill Jockey, 1996)
 Inindependence CD (Thrill Jockey, 1998)
 ...So, Were They in Some Sort of Fight? double CD (My Pal God, 1999)

References

External links 
Interview
Brainwashed A Minor Forest site
Thrill Jockey A Minor Forest site
My Pal God site for So Were They in Some Sort of Fight?
Bio by Jason Ankeny, Rovi
 77 Boadrum Site Profile Viva Radio, Sep 2007.  (Flash)

Musical groups from San Francisco
Math rock groups
Musical groups established in 1992
American post-rock groups
My Pal God Records artists